A Precocious Girl (German title: Csibi, der Fratz aka Früchtchen) is a 1934 Austrian comedy film directed by Max Neufeld and Richard Eichberg and starring Franciska Gaal, Leopoldine Konstantin and Herbert Hübner. The film's sets were designed by art director Julius von Borsody.

The film was made by the German subsidiary of Universal Pictures. Because of the Nazi rise to power Gaal and other Jewish filmmakers went to Austria and Hungary to work on a series of comedy films. A separate Italian version of the story Unripe Fruit was released the same year.

It was remade in Hollywood in 1942 as Between Us Girls, with the setting moved to America.

Cast
 Franciska Gaal as Lucie Carell, nicknamed Csibi  
 Leopoldine Konstantin as Maria, her mother  
 Herbert Hübner as Hartwig  
 Friedl Haerlin as Eva, seine Frau  
 Hermann Thimig as Dr. Werner  
 Anton Edthofer as Dr. Lohnau  
 Tibor Halmay as Berky  
 Theo Lingen as Anton, Diener bei Dr. Werner  
 Hans Richter as Kurt - ein 14jähriger Junge  
 Anton Pointner as Der Herr im Frack  
 F.W. Schröder-Schrom as Der Theaterdirektor  
 Alfred Neugebauer as Der Bankier  
 Margarete Kupfer as Gertrude  
 Christl Giampietro as Emma, Lohnaus Schwester  
 Helene Lauterböck as Die Vorsteherin des Internats  
 Heinz Hanus as Waiter

See also
Between Us Girls (1942)

References

Bibliography 
 Hans-Michael Bock and Tim Bergfelder. The Concise Cinegraph: An Encyclopedia of German Cinema. Berghahn Books.

External links 
 

1934 films
Austrian comedy films
1934 comedy films
1930s German-language films
Films directed by Max Neufeld
Films directed by Richard Eichberg
Films produced by Joe Pasternak
Austrian black-and-white films